Kannada poetry dates back many centuries, to before the time of Adikavi Pampa. A revival took place in the early 20th century led by Kuvempu,  Dattatreya Ramachandra Bendre, B. M. Srikanthaiah and others. The genre was further developed after Indian independence with poets including Gopalakrishna Adiga.

A

 Gopalakrishna Adiga
 K. S. Nissar Ahmed
 Amoghavarsha
 U. R. Ananthamurthy
 Kappe Arabhatta
 Asaga (9th century)
 Aravind Malagatti
 Anupama Niranjana
 Aryamba Pattabhi

B

 Basavanna
 D. R. Bendre
 S.L.Bhairappa

C

 Chamarasa
 Chikkupadhyaya
 Gangadhar V. Chittal
 Chavundaraya

D

 Kanaka Dasa
 Purandara Dasa
 Dinakara Desai
 Devanur Mahadeva

E

 Subbanna Ekkundi

G

 Gangadevi
 D. V. Gundappa
 V. K. Gokak

H

Pha. Gu. Halakatti

I

 Masti Venkatesha Iyengar
 M. K. Indira

J

 Janna
 Jayalakshmi Seethapura

K

 Gourish Kaikini
 Jayant Kaikini
 Chandrashekhara Kambara
 Girish Karnad
 Shivarama Karanth
 Kuvempu

M

 Akka Mahadevi
 A. N. Murthy Rao

N

 Nagavarma I
 Nagavarma II
 K. S. Narasimhaswamy
 P. T. Narasimhachar
 K. V. Narayana

P

 M. Govinda Pai
 Adikavi Pampa
 Sri Ponna
 Allama Prabhu
 Pandhareenathachar Galagali
 Pratibha Nandakumar

R

 Raghavanka
 Kayyar Kinhanna Rai
 G. P. Rajarathnam
 Ranna
 Rudrabhatta
 Baraguru Ramachandrappa

S

 Sara Aboobacker
 Mamta Sagar
 Sarvajna
 Shishunala Sharif
 Shivakotiacharya
 G. S. Shivarudrappa
 B. M. Srikantaiah
 T. N. Srikantaiah
 B. G. L. Swamy

T

 Poornachandra Tejaswi
 Tirumalamba
 Triveni

V

 Kumara Vyasa
 Vyasatirtha
 Vani
 H. S. Venkateshamurthy
 Kum. Veerabhadrappa
 Vaidehi

References

Kannada language
Kannada language